Emily S. Day is an American biomedical engineer. She is an associate professor at the University of Delaware where her research team engineers nanoparticles to enable high precision therapy of diseases including cancers, blood disorders, and maternal/fetal health complications.

Early life and education
Day was born and raised in Ponca City, Oklahoma. She earned her Bachelor of Science degree in Physics, with a minor in Mathematics, from the University of Oklahoma before completing her PhD in Bioengineering from Rice University. She then earned a Postdoctoral Fellowship at Northwestern University.

Career
Upon completing her postdoctoral fellowship at Northwestern, Day became an assistant professor of Biomedical Engineering at the University of Delaware. There, she leads the Day Lab, which seeks to transform disease management through the development of nanomedicines. Her group has made substantial contributions to the fields of photothermal therapy and gene regulation. In photothermal therapy, nanoparticles delivered into tumors are excited with externally-applied near-infrared light, causing the nanoparticles to produce heat sufficient to destroy the cancer cells. The goal of gene regulation is to "modulate the expression of the genes that drive the cancer growth." In addition to developing ribonucleic acid (RNA) nanocarriers that enable RNA interference-mediated gene regulation, Day and her team have developed antibody-nanoparticle conjugates that can regulate cancer cell signaling by binding to cancer cell-specific transmembrane receptors and blocking their interaction with extracellular ligands. These antibody-nanoparticle conjugates are more effective than freely delivered antibodies, which Day and her team attribute to multivalent binding (the ability of the antibody-nanoparticle conjugates to engage multiple receptors simultaneously).

Day has received numerous grants to support her research, including a National Science Foundation CAREER award and a National Institutes of Health R35 award. Day's notable accolades include the 2018 Gerard J. Mangone Young Scholars Award from the University of Delaware Francis Alison Society and the Rita Schaffer Young Investigator Award from the Biomedical Engineering Society. In recognition of her academic accomplishments, Day was selected to participate in the National Academy of Engineering’s U.S. Frontiers of Engineering symposium.

During the COVID-19 pandemic in North America, Day was promoted from assistant professor to associate professor with tenure. In 2022, she was elected a Fellow of the American Institute for Medical and Biological Engineering for "developing engineered nanoparticles that are transforming basic science and translational medicine and exemplary service greatly increasing DEI in STEM."

Personal life
Day is married to John Hundley Slater, a fellow Associate Professor of Biomedical Engineering at the University of Delaware.

References

External links

Living people
People from Ponca City, Oklahoma
American biomedical engineers
Rice University alumni
University of Oklahoma alumni
University of Delaware faculty
Year of birth missing (living people)
Fellows of the American Institute for Medical and Biological Engineering